Without Men is a 2011 romantic comedy film directed by Gabriela Tagliavini and starring Eva Longoria, Christian Slater, Kate del Castillo, and Oscar Nuñez. It is based on the novel Tales from the Town of Widows by James Cañón.

Premise
Wives in a Latin American village fend for themselves after their husbands are conscripted to fight in a guerrilla war. Comedy, lesbian love, and unexpected consequences arise when the men return to find they are no longer allowed to be in charge.

Cast
 Eva Longoria as Rosalba Viuda de Patiño
 Christian Slater as Gordon Smith
 Oscar Nuñez as Priest Rafael
 Kate del Castillo as Cleotilde Huaniso
 Guillermo Díaz as Campo Elias
 Maria Conchita Alonso as Lucrecia
 Camryn Manheim as Boss
 Paul Rodriguez as Camacho
 Mónica Huarte as Cecilia
 Yvette Yates as Virgelina

Reception
Robert Koehler of Variety called it a "cheapo sex comedy stuffed with mugging actors and TV-scale filmmaking."

See also 
List of LGBT-related films directed by women

References

External links
 

2011 films
2011 romantic comedy films
American LGBT-related films
American romantic comedy films
Films scored by Carlo Siliotto
2010s English-language films
2010s American films
LGBT-related romantic comedy films